Rockland All Saints is a village and former civil parish, now in the parish of Rocklands, in the Breckland district, in the county of Norfolk, England. In 1881 the parish had a population of 324. Rockland All Saints has a church called All Saints' which is less than a mile from the village.

History 
The name "Rockland" means 'Rook grove'. Rockland was recorded in the Domesday Book as Rokelun(d)lunt. On 25 March 1885 the parish was abolished and merged with Rockland St. Andrews to form Rockland All Saints and St. Andrews.

References 

Villages in Norfolk
Former civil parishes in Norfolk
Breckland District